Song of India may refer to:

 Song of India, common name for plant dracaena reflexa, first described in 1786
 "Song of India" (song), aria from Rimsky-Korsakov's 1896 opera Sadko
 "Song of India", alternative name for "Sare Jahan se Accha", 1904 Urdu poem, later song
 Song of India (film), 1949 American romantic adventure drama, starring Sabu